Alexandrovka is a rural locality (a selo) in Umyotovskoye Rural Settlement, Kamyshinsky District, Volgograd Oblast, Russia. The population was 21 as of 2010. There are 2 streets.

Geography 
Alexandrovka is located in forest steppe, on the Volga Upland, on the left bank of the Ilovlya River, 36 km north of Kamyshin (the district's administrative centre) by road. Umet is the nearest rural locality.

References 

Rural localities in Kamyshinsky District